Federal Route 115, or Jalan Pantai Cenang, is a major federal road in Langkawi Island, Kedah, Malaysia.

Features

One of the famous attractions is Pantai Cenang, a long west coast town of Langkawi. It is dubbed as "Waikiki" of Malaysia.

At most sections, the Federal Route 115 was built under the JKR R5 road standard, with a speed limit of 90 km/h.

List of junctions and towns

References

Malaysian Federal Roads